The list of ship commissionings in 1861 includes a chronological list of ships commissioned in 1861.  In cases where no official commissioning ceremony was held, the date of service entry may be used instead.


References

See also 

1861
 Ship commissionings